Nir1 or Membrane-associated phosphatidylinositol transfer protein 3 (PITPNM3) is a mammalian protein that localizes to endoplasmic reticulum (ER) and plasma membrane (PM) membrane contact sites (MCS) and aids the transfer of phosphatidylinositol between these two membranes, potentially by recruiting additional proteins to the ER-PM MCS.

Classification 
Nir1 has been classically categorized as a class IIA phosphatidylinositol transfer protein (PITP) that transfers phosphatidylinositol (PI) and phosphatidic acid (PA) between membranes. Class IIA PITPs are the multi-domain proteins PITPNM1/Nir2 (Drosophila homolog RdgBaI), PITPNM2/Nir3 (Drosophila homolog RdgBaII).. Nir1 shares high sequence similarity with Nir2 and Nir3, which led to its original categorization as a PITP. However, it was determined that Nir1 is not directly responsible for PI transfer, as it lacks the functional PITP domain seen within Nir2 and Nir3

Localization 
Recently, Nir1 has been shown to localize to ER-PM MCS, both under basal conditions and upon phospholipase C (PLC) activation. Notably, PLC activation has previously been shown to regulate the localization of Nir2 and Nir3 at ER-PM MCS well.. The MCS-targeting by Nir1 is achieved by the N-terminus of Nir1 localizing to the ER and the C-terminus of Nir1 localizing to the PM. The domains responsible for binding these membranes are discussed below.

Structure 
Nir1 contains three main structural elements that are shared with Nir2 and Nir3: an N-terminal FFAT motif, a DDHD domain, and a C-terminal Lipin/Ndel/Smp2 (LNS2) domain.

FFAT motif 
The FFAT motif is made up of double phenylalanines (FF) in an Acidic Tract. This motif, made of residues EFFDA in Nir1, has been shown to be necessary for the Nir proteins to associate with the ER proteins VAPA and VAPB. Mutation of the phenylalanine residues in this motif or knockout of the VAPA and VAPB proteins results in a loss of ER-PM MCS localization and causes Nir1 to become fully localized to the PM.

DDHD domain 
The DDHD domain, made up of 3 Asp and 1 His residues, bears some similarities to that seen in PLA1 enzymes, which hydrolyze fatty acids of glycerolphospholipids, including phosphatidic acid (PA). However, this domain is still largely uncharacterized. It is a putative metal binding domain, but a role for metal binding in PITPNM function has not been established

LNS2 domain 
The LNS2 domain is the Lipin/Nde1/Smp2 domain. This domain was discovered as having sequence similarities to the phosphatidic acid (PA) binding region found within the Lipin family of proteins. It is also responsible for PA-binding within Nir1, as it has been shown to co-localize with PA biosensors. The LNS2 domain targets the C-terminus of Nir1 to the plasma membrane in order to allow the protein to bridge the ER-PM MCS. Deletion of this domain results in Nir1 localization to the ER. It should be noted however, that the exact domain boundaries of the LNS2 domain are still being debated, especially given the boundaries of the folded domains predicted by the AlphaFold Protein Structure Database. (Alphafold structure of Nir1)

Function 
The PITPNM family of proteins has been shown to participate in the phosphoinositide cycle. Lipids cycle between the PM and the ER in order to replenish levels after signaling events deplete lipid species such as PI.. When a stimulus results in the production of PA at the PM, Nir2 and Nir3 move to the ER-PM MCS, where they exchange the PA at the PM for PI that has been produced in the ER. As Nir1 is localized to the ER-PM MCS even without a stimulus, it is thought that Nir1 helps to recruit Nir2 to the MCS. There is evidence that Nir1 recruits Nir2 directly via binding to the uncharacterized domain between the FFAT and DDHD of Nir1

References 

Proteins
Endoplasmic reticulum
Membrane biology